A county, constitutionally known as a hsien, is a de jure second-level administrative division unit in the Republic of China (Taiwan). Under the administrative structure of Taiwan, it is with the same level of a provincial city. 

The counties were formerly under the jurisdiction of provinces, but the provinces were streamlined and effectively downsized to non-self-governing bodies in 1998, in 2018 all provincial governmental organs were formally abolished. Counties along with former "provincial cities" which alternately designated as simply "Cities", are presently regarded as principal subdivisions directed by the central government of Taiwan.

History 

Hsien have existed since the Warring States Period, and were set up nation-wide by the Qin Dynasty. The number of counties in China proper gradually increased from dynasty to dynasty. As Qin Shi Huang reorganized the counties after his unification, there were about 1000. Under the Eastern Han Dynasty, the number of counties increased to above 1,000. About 1400 existed when the Sui dynasty abolished the commandery level (郡 jùn), which was the level just above counties, and demoted some commanderies to counties. In Imperial China, the county was a significant administrative unit because it marked the lowest level of the imperial bureaucratic structure — in other words, it was the lowest level that the government reached. Government below the county level was often undertaken through informal non-bureaucratic means, varying between dynasties. The head of a county was the magistrate, who oversaw both the day-to-day operations of the county as well as civil and criminal cases. The current number of counties mostly resembled that of the later years of Qing dynasty. 

The first administrative divisions named "county" was first established in 1661 by the Kingdom of Tungning. The later ruler Qing empire inherited this type of administrative divisions. With the increase of Han Chinese population in Taiwan, the number of counties also grew by time. By the end of Qing era, there were 11 counties in Taiwan. Protestant missions in China first romanized the term as hien.

Taiwan was ceded to Japan by the Treaty of Shimonoseki in 1895. The hierarchy of divisions also incorporated into the Japanese system in the period when Taiwan under Japanese rule. By September 1945, Taiwan was divided into 8 prefectures ( and ).

After the retrocession to the China on 25 October 1945, the prefectures were reformed into eight counties with the same name under Taiwan Province of the Republic of China. Their roman spellings were also changed to reflect the official language shift from Japanese to Mandarin Chinese, but characters remained the same. Note that most of the Japanese prefectural cities were reformed to provincial cities and are not a part of counties.

Changes of location and names of counties in Chinese history have been a major field of research in Chinese historical geography, especially from the 1960s to the 1980s.

In late 1949, the government of the Republic of China lost the Chinese Civil War and was relocated to Taipei, Taiwan. In 1950, the counties in Taiwan were reorganized. Counties in populous western Taiwan were split into two to three counties. This pushed the number of counties up to 16. After the war, the government only controlled a few offshore islands of mainland China. Among them are two of the 67 counties of the original Fujian Province: Kinmen and Lienchiang. The number of counties under jurisdiction, 16 in Taiwan and 2 in Fujian, remained stable until the early 1990s.

Following the democratic reforms in the early 1990s, more proposals of administrative division reforms were widely discussed and ultimately caused some populous counties be reformed to special municipalities in the 2010 and 2014. These counties are:

 Kaohsiung County (1945–2010), now part of Kaohsiung special municipality; the county seat was at Fengshan City
 Taichung County (1945–2010), now part of Taichung special municipality; the county seat was at Fengyuan City
 Tainan County (1945–2010), now part of Tainan special municipality; the county seat was located at Xinying City
 Taipei County (1945–2010), now New Taipei special municipality; the county seat was located at Banqiao City
 Taoyuan County (1950–2014), now Taoyuan special municipality; the county seat was located at Taoyuan City (county-controlled)

Currently, the counties are established according to the Local Government Act under the supervision of the Ministry of the Interior. This act also endorses some special articles that grants counties with a population of over two million can grant some extra privileges in local autonomy that was designed for special municipalities. This type of counties are often called quasi-municipalities. This term applied to New Taipei and Taoyuan before they became special municipalities.

Current counties 

There are currently 13 counties:

Under Article 9 of the Additional Articles of the Constitution of the Republic of China, regulated by the Local Government Act, each county has a government headed by an elected county magistrate and an elected county council exercising legislative functions. The governing bodies (executive and legislature) of the counties are:

See also

 Political divisions of Taiwan (1895–1945)
 Prefectures of Japan
 Counties of the People's Republic of China

References

Notes

Words in native languages 

Counties, Taiwan (Republic of China)
Taiwan 1
Taiwan